Gina Marie Mason (née Crafts; December 30, 1959 – September 5, 2017) was an American politician.

Mason was born in Lewiston, Maine, the daughter of Chauncey and Carmella DeBurra Crafts. She lived in Lisbon, Maine and graduated from Lisbon High School in 1978. In 1980, Mason graduated from Westbrook College with a degree in fashion merchandising and retail buying. She was involved with the fashion business. She served on the Lisbon Town Board and the Lisbon School Committee. She served in the Maine House of Representatives in 2017 and was a Republican. Her son Garrett Mason and their cousin Dale J. Crafts also served in the Maine Legislature. Gina Mason died suddenly while still in office on September 5, 2017. She was 57 years old. Her husband Rick Mason succeeded his wife to the Maine Legislature.

References 

1959 births
2017 deaths
21st-century American politicians
21st-century American women politicians
Maine city council members
Republican Party members of the Maine House of Representatives
Politicians from Lewiston, Maine
People from Lisbon, Maine
Businesspeople from Maine
School board members in Maine
Westbrook College alumni
Women state legislators in Maine
Women city councillors in Maine
20th-century American businesspeople
20th-century American women